Open Rack is an Open Compute Project standard for a new rack and power delivery architecture and an efficient, scalable alternative to the EIA-310 rack. It differs from the traditional EIA-310 19" rack in that it was designed specifically for large scale cloud deployments. There are four key features that make this rack design more efficient to deploy, support, and operate. The power to all of the compute, storage, or network devices is supplied by a pair of bus bars located in the rear of the rack. The bus bars are supplied with 48V DC by a shelf of power supplies which provides efficient conversion from the local (usually 3-phase) AC mains supply. The IT equipment that fits into Open Rack is 21" or 538mm wide. This is a 15% increase in frontal area that provides more airflow to the IT devices, enabling the data center to reduce cooling costs. The vertical spacing is also taller to accommodate better airflow and structurally better enclosures that do not sag and interfere with adjacent equipment. All of the cables and interconnects are made from the front of the rack and the IT equipment is hot-pluggable and serviceable from the front of the rack. Service personnel no longer access the rear of the rack or need to work in the hot aisle.

Specification

OpenU 
Open Rack rack units are called OpenU or just OU. An Open Rack consists of three modular zones: power, equipment, and cable.

Physically, OU cabinets maintain the same 24" external width as traditional server cabinets to maintain compatibility with existing server infrastructure. However, an OpenU is slightly taller, to improve airflow and cable management.

Power Zones

Equipment Bay 
An Equipment Bay is 21" or 538 mm wide. An equipment bay rests on support shelves and blind-mates with the power supply through bus bars.

External links 
 Reference specifications and designs.
 Rack & Power section of Open Compute Project website.

References 

Computer enclosure
Server hardware
Mechanical standards